12th Division may refer to:

Infantry divisions
 12th Division (Australia)
 12th Reserve Division (German Empire), a unit of the Imperial German Army in World War I
 12th Infantry Division (Germany), a German military unit that fought during World War II
 12th Mechanized Infantry Division (Greece), a Greek unit based at Alexandroupoli, Thrace
 12th Infantry Division Sassari (Kingdom of Italy)
 12th Indian Division – British Indian Army during World War I
 12th Infantry Division (India)
 12th Division (Imperial Japanese Army), was an infantry division in the Imperial Japanese Army
 12th Division (North Korea), was a division of the Korean People's Army
 12th Infantry Division (Pakistan), is a Pakistani Army infantry division currently based in Murree, Punjab
 12th Infantry Division (Poland), was a tactical unit of the Polish Army in the interbellum period
 12th Amurskaya Rifle Division, was a military formation of the Red Army during World War II
 12th (Eastern) Division, was a division raised by the British Army during the First World War
 12th (Eastern) Infantry Division, was a division raised by the British Army during the Second World War
 12th Division (United States), infantry division of the United States Army, active in 1918–1919
 Philippine Division (United States), also designated as the US 12th Infantry Division

Armoured divisions
 12th SS Panzer Division Hitlerjugend (Germany)
 12th Armored Division (United States)

Aviation divisions

 12th Air Division (United States)

See also

 Twelfth Army (disambiguation)
 XII Corps (disambiguation)
 12th Wing (disambiguation)
 12th Regiment (disambiguation)
 12th Brigade (disambiguation)
 12 Squadron (disambiguation)